Albert Edward Baharagate (born 25 February 1930), is a Ugandan Roman Catholic priest who served as Bishop of the Roman Catholic Diocese of Hoima. He was appointed as bishop of Hoima on 7 July 1969 and he resigned on 9 March 1991.

Background and priesthood
Baharagate was born on 25 February 1930, in Nyamigisa Village, in present-day Masindi District, in Bunyoro sub-region, in the Western Region of Uganda. He was ordained a priest on 7 December 1958.

As bishop
He was appointed Bishop of Hoima on 7 July 1969 and was consecrated a bishop at Hoima on 1 August 1969 by Pope Paul VI†, assisted by Archbishop Sergio Pignedoli†, Titular Archbishop of Iconium and Archbishop Emmanuel Kiwanuka Nsubuga†, Archbishop of Archdiocese of Kampala.

On 9 March 1991, Baharagate resigned as Bishop of Hoima. As of July 2019, he lives on as Bishop Emeritus of Hoima.

Succession table

References

External links

 Profile of the Roman Catholic Diocese of Hoima

1930 births
Living people
People from Masindi District
20th-century Roman Catholic bishops in Uganda
Roman Catholic bishops of Hoima